Grzegorz Adam Urbanowski (born 24 December 1959 in Pultusk), Polish ultramarathon racewalker. Sports career started as a cyclist, then for a short period competed in long-distance running, finally settling on a sporty gait. In 1990, he won the Polish Championship, and in 1991 the title of vice-Polish 50 km (3:58:19 - RZ) since 1992, specializes in marches at distances of 200 km or more. He won ten times (in the years 1994, 1996-1998, 2001–03, 2005-07) the Paris-Colmar, setting a historical record for the competition previously held by Roger Quemener.

See also
1983 IAAF World Race Walking Cup
1989 IAAF World Race Walking Cup

References

External links
Biography on marchons.com

1959 births
Living people
Polish ultramarathon runners
Male ultramarathon runners
Polish male racewalkers
People from Pułtusk